William Sean Collum (born 18 January 1979) is a Scottish football referee.

Career
Collum officiated his first Scottish Football League match in November 2004, and his first SPL match in April 2006. He took charge of his first UEFA Champions League match in September 2010, overseeing FC Copenhagen's 2–0 win away at Panathinaikos, and has also officiated several high profile international matches and UEFA Europa League matches. On 11 June 2012 it was announced that Collum had been elevated to FIFA Elite Referee level joining Craig Thomson on the 24-strong list of the world’s leading referees.

His major domestic appointments include the Scottish Cup finals of 2013, 2015 and 2019, and the 2012 Scottish League Cup Final.

Teaching career
Collum was previously the principal teacher of the Religious Education department at Uddingston grammar, He then taught R.E. at St Aidan's High School in Wishaw, eventually returning to Cardinal Newman High School as an R.E. teacher in August 2012. He started his teaching career in 2000 at St Ambrose High School in Coatbridge working alongside notable teachers including John Cushley and Bob Winslow.

References

External links
William Collum, Soccerbase

1979 births
Living people
Sportspeople from Glasgow
Scottish football referees
UEFA Champions League referees
UEFA Europa League referees
Scottish Roman Catholics
Scottish schoolteachers
UEFA Euro 2016 referees
Scottish Football League referees
Scottish Premier League referees
Scottish Professional Football League referees